The following is an incomplete list of notable video game projects (in hardware, software, and related media) that have embarked upon crowdfunding campaigns. Only when the amount raised is highlighted in green did the project receive those funds.

See also
 List of most successful crowdfunding projects

References

Video game crowdfunding projects
 
Crowdfunding projects